John Edwin Meyer (February 20, 1942 – November 4, 2020) was an American professional football player and coach. He played as a linebacker for the Houston Oilers in the American Football League (AFL).

Biography 
Meyer graduated from Brother Rice High School.

Playing career 
Meyer played at the collegiate level at the University of Notre Dame. He played with the Houston Oilers of the AFL as a linebacker during the 1966 AFL season after being traded to the team by the Buffalo Bills. The Bills had drafted him in the fifteenth round of the 1965 AFL Draft. Meyer had also been drafted by the St. Louis Cardinals in the eighth round of the 1965 NFL Draft. While with the Oilers, John played all fourteen games in 1966 at linebacker before suffering a career-ending injury. After his playing career, John became one of the youngest assistant coaches in the NFL.

Coaching career 
Meyer served as an assistant coach with the Oilers, New England Patriots and Detroit Lions before joining the Green Bay Packers. With the Packers, he served as linebackers coach from 1975 to 1979 and defensive coordinator from 1980 to 1983. Following his time in the NFL, Meyer later became a part-time assistant coach at St. Norbert College.

Death 
Meyer died  from COVID-19 on November 4, 2020, at age 78.

References 

1942 births
2020 deaths
Sportspeople from Chicago
Players of American football from Chicago
Houston Oilers players
American football linebackers
Notre Dame Fighting Irish football players
National Football League defensive coordinators
Green Bay Packers coaches
Detroit Lions coaches
New England Patriots coaches
Houston Oilers coaches
St. Norbert Green Knights football coaches
American Football League players
Deaths from the COVID-19 pandemic in Illinois